In colonial and early republican Chile capitán de amigos (lit. captain of friends) were Spanish and Mestizo officials who surveilled  friendly indigenous tribes. Capitanes de amigos were oversighted by higher-ranking officials known as comisario de naciones. It was not uncommon for a capitán de amigos to live among the indegnous peoples he was in charge of, sometimes marrying indigenous women and even adopting prohibited customs such as Mapuche polygamy. Knowing both Spanish and indigenous cultures some capines de amigos took advantage of this to profit in frontier trade. In times of indigenous revolts information provided by capitanes de amigos was crucial for Spanish and Chilean authorities.

References

History of the Captaincy General of Chile
Huilliche history
Legal history of Chile
Legal history of Spain
Mapuche history
Arauco War
Diplomats by role
Titles